Moderation and Development Party is a political party in Iran. It is a pragmatic-centrist political party which held its first congress in 2002.

Platform
The party is part of the faction called "modernist right", "moderate reformists" and "technocrats" that draws from upper-level bureaucrats, industrialists and managers. It deals with a platform on modernization and economic growth rather than social justice, along with the Executives of Construction Party and the Islamic Labour Party. 
The party has been allied with Popular Coalition of Reforms and Pervasive Coalition of Reformists in parliamentary elections and has had good relations with both Mohammad Khatami’s reform program and Akbar Hashemi Rafsanjani. In April 2017, the party joined the supreme policymaking council of reformists.

Some sources branded them as part of the conservative camp in the 2000s or reformists under the leadership of Akbar Hashemi Rafsanjani. In 2003, the party's spokesperson wrote in Hamshahri that the party regards itself among "true reformists", who are idealists considering "social realities" interpreted with the "principle of moderation".

According to Ali Afshari, the party prioritizes economic expansion and follows free market policies, however a minority faction represented by members such as Nobakht, advocate institutionalized economy and maintain that the government should interfere to regulate markets to a limited extent. They support limited political and cultural transformations, and believe political activism should only be within the frameworks of the constitution. The party also embraces Velayat Faqih.

Presidential candidates

Members

Current officeholders 

Cabinet
 Hassan Rouhani, President of Iran
 Mahmoud Vaezi, Chief of Staff
 Mohammad Bagher Nobakht, Vice President for Strategy
 Masoud Soltanifar, Minister of Sports
Parliament
 Bahram Parsaei (Shiraz)
 Zahra Saei (Tabriz, Osku and Azarshahr)
 Ali Nobakht (Tehran, Rey, Shemiranat and Eslamshahr)
 Ramezanali Sobhanifar (Sabzevar, Joghatai and Joveyn)
 Hadi Bahadori (Urmia)
 Sakineh Almasi (Kangan, Jam, Dayyer and Asaluyeh)
 Rasoul Khezri (Piranshahr and Sardasht)
 Shadmehr Kazemzadeh (Dehloran, Darreshahr and Abdanan)

References

Centrism in Iran
Reformist political groups in Iran
Political parties established in 1999
1999 establishments in Iran
Centrist parties in Iran